Belcourt is a census-designated place (CDP) in Rolette County, North Dakota, United States. It is within the Turtle Mountain Indian Reservation.  The population was 1,510 at the 2020 census.

The community is the seat of the Turtle Mountain Band of Chippewa Indians. Belcourt was originally known as Siipiising, which is Anishinaabe (Chippewa) for "creek that sings with life-giving water."  The name refers to what European Americans called "Ox Creek", which flows through the center of town.

Belcourt was laid out in 1884. The community was named Belcourt in honour of Georges-Antoine Belcourt,. Father Belcourt was a French Canadian Roman Catholic diocesan priest and missionary who served the Chippewa and Métis throughout his ministry in the mid-nineteenth century. Belcourt advocated politically on the behalf of the Anishinaabeg and Métis in Canada and in the United States until 1859. Father Belcourt described the Chippewa historical territory in the Pembina River basin as covering an area about 400 miles from north to south and 500 miles from east to west.

The town is served by different forms of media, such as KEYA, a tribal radio station that can be found at 88.5 FM; and the Turtle Mountain Times, the tribally owned newspaper that was established in 2003. The Tribal Independent, an independently owned online newspaper, was established in 2011 and folded in 2012.

Geography
Belcourt is located at  (48.840666, -99.746588).

It is named after Father Belcourt.

Demographics

2010 census
As of the census of 2010, there were 2,078 people, 711 households, and 465 families in the city. The racial makeup of the city was 2.6% White, 0.2% African American, 95.8% Native American, 0.1% Asian, 0.1% from other races, and 1.1% from two or more races. Hispanic or Latino of any race were 1.4% of the population.

There were 711 households, of which 36.3% had children under the age of 18 living with them, 27.0% were married couples living together, 30.8% had a female householder with no husband present, 7.6% had a male householder with no wife present, and 34.6% were non-families. 30.1% of all households were made up of individuals, and 9.8% had someone living alone who was 65 years of age or older. The average household size was 2.88 and the average family size was 3.54.

The median age in the city was 27.8 years. 35.8% of residents were under the age of 18; 10.8% were between the ages of 18 and 24; 23.6% were from 25 to 44; 21.2% were from 45 to 64; and 8.7% were 65 years of age or older. The gender makeup of the city was 49.3% male and 50.7% female.

2000 census
As of the census of 2000, there were 2,440 people, 806 households, and 561 families residing in the CDP. The population density was 417.0 people per square mile (161.0/km2). There were 856 housing units at an average density of 146.3/sq mi (56.5/km2). The racial makeup of the CDP was 3.93% White, 0.12% African American, 95.41% Native American, 0.25% from other races, and 0.29% from two or more races. Hispanic or Latino of any race were 0.94% of the population.

There were 806 households, out of which 46.4% had children under the age of 18 living with them, 27.5% were married couples living together, 33.5% had a female householder with no husband present, and 30.3% were non-families. 24.9% of all households were made up of individuals, and 8.6% had someone living alone who was 65 years of age or older. The average household size was 2.96 and the average family size was 3.54.

In the CDP, the population was spread out, with 38.6% under the age of 18, 12.5% from 18 to 24, 26.1% from 25 to 44, 16.5% from 45 to 64, and 6.2% who were 65 years of age or older. The median age was 24 years. For every 100 females, there were 95.0 males. For every 100 females age 18 and over, there were 88.2 males.

The median income for a household in the CDP was $12,880, and the median income for a family was $15,000. Males had a median income of $23,047 versus $17,292 for females. The per capita income for the CDP was $8,432. About 49.6% of families and 53.9% of the population were below the poverty line, including 65.3% of those under age 18 and 30.6% of those age 65 or over.

Climate
This climatic region is typified by large seasonal temperature differences, with warm to hot (and often humid) summers and cold (sometimes severely cold) winters.  According to the Köppen Climate Classification system, Belcourt has a humid continental climate, abbreviated "Dfb" on climate maps.

Education
The local school district is the Belcourt School District (Turtle Mountain Community School).

See also
 Turtle Mountain Indian Reservation

References

Census-designated places in Rolette County, North Dakota
Census-designated places in North Dakota